Aeroport is a rural locality (a selo), and one of three settlements in Teploklyuchevsky Rural Okrug of Tomponsky District in the Sakha Republic, Russia, in addition to Teplyy Klyuch, the administrative center of the Rural Okrug and Razbilka. Its population as of the 2002 Census was 243.

References

Notes

Sources
Official website of the Sakha Republic. Registry of the Administrative-Territorial Divisions of the Sakha Republic. Tomponsky District. 

Rural localities in Tomponsky District